Crumomyia is a genus of flies belonging to the family lesser dung flies (Sphaeroceridae).

Species

References 

Sphaeroceridae
Schizophora genera
Muscomorph flies of Europe
Taxa named by Pierre-Justin-Marie Macquart